Aroldo Ruschioni (born 1932) was an Italian paralympic multi-sport athlete who won six medals at the Summer Paralympics.

See also
 Italy at the 1960 Summer Paralympics
 Italy at the 1968 Summer Paralympics
 Italy at the 1972 Summer Paralympics

References

External links
 
 Aroldo Ruschioni   at Memoria paralimpica

1932 births
Living people
Paralympic snooker players of Italy
Paralympic swimmers of Italy
Paralympic table tennis players of Italy
Paralympic wheelchair fencers of Italy
Paralympic gold medalists for Italy
Paralympic silver medalists for Italy
Paralympic bronze medalists for Italy
Paralympic medalists in snooker
Paralympic medalists in swimming
Paralympic medalists in table tennis
Paralympic medalists in wheelchair fencing
Snooker players at the 1968 Summer Paralympics
Snooker players at the 1972 Summer Paralympics
Swimmers at the 1960 Summer Paralympics
Table tennis players at the 1960 Summer Paralympics
Table tennis players at the 1964 Summer Paralympics
Table tennis players at the 1968 Summer Paralympics
Wheelchair fencers at the 1960 Summer Paralympics
Wheelchair fencers at the 1964 Summer Paralympics
Medalists at the 1960 Summer Paralympics
Medalists at the 1968 Summer Paralympics
Medalists at the 1972 Summer Paralympics
People from Macerata
Sportspeople from the Province of Macerata
Italian male swimmers
Italian snooker players
Italian male table tennis players
Italian male fencers